David Henry Gambrell (December 20, 1929 – May 6, 2021) was an American attorney who represented Georgia in the United States Senate from 1971 through 1972.

Education and legal career
Gambrell was born in Atlanta, Georgia, on December 20, 1929, the son of Kathleen (Hagood) and Smythe Gambrell. He graduated from Davidson College in 1949, and received his JD, with honors, from Harvard Law School in 1952. He served in the reserves of the United States Army. After serving as a Teaching Fellow at Harvard and then as an associate and partner at the King & Spalding law firm in Atlanta, Gambrell founded Gambrell & Stolz, LLP in 1963. He served as president of the Atlanta Bar Association from 1965 to 1966, and as president of the State Bar of Georgia from 1967 to 1968. He also served in the American Bar Association House of Delegates, on the Board of Editors of the ABA Journal, and as Director of the National Legal Aid and Defender Association. In 2002, he received the State Bar of Georgia's Distinguished Service Award, and the Atlanta Bar Association, in 2007, honored him with their Leadership Award.

Political career
Gambrell went on to take part in state politics, serving as chairman of the Georgia Democratic Party from 1970–1971. In 1971, upon the death of Richard Russell, Jr., Governor Jimmy Carter appointed Gambrell to the United States Senate, where he served during the years 1971 and 1972. While in the Senate he served as a member of the Banking Committee, Aeronautics and Space Committee, and Senate Select Committee on Small Business. Gambrell, a moderate, was defeated in the Democratic primary runoff in 1972 by the more conservative Sam Nunn, who went on to serve in the Senate for the next twenty-four years. Gambrell sought the Democratic nomination for Governor in 1974, but fared badly, finishing behind Lester Maddox, George Busbee (the eventual winner), and Bert Lance.

Other activities
Gambrell has also served in a number of public, business and civic roles, including the Directorships of three publicly held corporations, the Visiting Committees of Davidson College, Harvard Law School, Emory University and the Board of Directors of the Georgia Chamber of Commerce. He has also served as Chairman of the Governor's Committee on Post-Secondary Education, as chairman of the Drafting Committee for the Education Article of the Georgia Constitution, as a member on the Board of Curators of the Georgia Historical Society and as a trustee of the Lawyers Foundation of Georgia. He retired as a director of American Software, Inc. and was a trustee of the Georgia Legal History Foundation.

Personal life
Gambrell was married to the former Luck Flanders, and has four children. Luck was a philanthropist in her hometown of Swainsboro, Georgia, having donated  of land to establish East Georgia State College in 1971; the college's library bears her name to honor this gift. Luck died on June 29, 2015. Gambrell died on May 6, 2021, after a period of declining health.

References

External links

1929 births
2021 deaths
Politicians from Atlanta
Military personnel from Georgia (U.S. state)
Georgia (U.S. state) lawyers
Democratic Party United States senators from Georgia (U.S. state)
United States Army officers
Davidson College alumni
Harvard Law School alumni
Georgia (U.S. state) Democrats
State political party chairs of Georgia (U.S. state)